Charles Sawyer-Hoare (born 21 April 1942) is a British former auto racing driver. He competed in Formula Three, before switching to saloon car racing with the European Touring Car Championship as well as the British Touring Car Championship.

Racing record

Complete British Saloon Car Championship results
(key) (Races in bold indicate pole position; races in italics indicate fastest lap.)

† Events with 2 races staged for the different classes.

References

British Touring Car Championship drivers
Living people
1942 births
Place of birth missing (living people)
British Formula Three Championship drivers
20th-century British people